Giuseppe Zucca (1887–1959) was an Italian screenwriter. He wrote twenty six screenplays during his career, including the 1949 adventure film William Tell.

Selected filmography
 The Old Guard (1934)
 Aldebaran (1935)
 Backstage (1939)
 The Iron Crown (1941)
The King of England Will Not Pay (1941)
 Blood Wedding (1941)
 Headlights in the Fog (1942)
 William Tell (1949)
 Red Seal (1950)
 The Lovers of Manon Lescaut (1954)

References

External links 
 

1887 births
1959 deaths
20th-century Italian screenwriters
Italian male screenwriters
Writers from Messina
20th-century Italian male writers
Film people from the Province of Messina